E. G. Paley was an English architect who practised from an office in Lancaster, Lancashire in the 19th century.  In 1838 he joined Edmund Sharpe as a pupil and became Sharpe's partner in 1845.  The practice was then known as "Sharpe and Paley, Architects".  Sharpe retired from the practice in 1851 and Paley worked as the only principal in the business until he was joined by Hubert Austin as a partner in 1868.

This list contains the works on buildings and structures other than churches which was carried out by the practice during the time that E. G. Paley was the only principal in the practice, as identified by Price.  It includes houses and schools, and a variety of other structures.

Key

Works

See also
Sharpe, Paley and Austin

References
Citations

Sources

 

 

Paley